The Harbor Springs Railway was a  narrow gauge railway built at Harbor Springs, Michigan on Little Traverse Bay on Lake Michigan. It was nicknamed the Hemlock Central because of the great numbers of hemlock trees growing in the area. The railway was chartered by Ephraim Shay, the inventor of the Shay locomotive, on February 2, 1902, but may have started construction as early as December 10, 1900.

It was primarily a lumber-hauling operation, although summer vacationing tourists were carried for a fare of 25¢. Small temporary branches were also constructed as well as the moving of the right of way when logging operations moved, as was typical for a logging railroad.

They were geared locomotives of the typical Shay pattern, but were unusual in that they had no frames, the boiler being the main structural component. The line was built and funded without debt (thanks to Shay's royalties and licenses from his locomotive designs) and by 1906, the investment in physical plant was estimated at $51,346 (equivalent to $ in ).

The line ceased operations in 1910 and was dismantled in 1912. The company dissolved on January 17, 1912.

Notes

References

External links
Michael Palin's Hemingway Adventure: Harbor Springs, Michigan
Ephraim Shay, the Man

Defunct Michigan railroads
2 ft 6 in gauge railways in the United States
Logging railroads in the United States
Narrow gauge railroads in Michigan